Doctors Medical Center (originally Brookside Hospital) was an eight-story, 120-bed public hospital in San Pablo, California which served 250,000 residents in western Contra Costa County from 1954 to 2015.

History

In 1948, the residents voted to create the West Contra Costa Hospital District, one of the Health care districts in California, for the purpose of building Brookside Hospital.  The five-story, 165-bed hospital cost $4 million and 3 years to construct, and opened its doors in 1954. The district (renamed the West Contra Costa Healthcare District in 1994) operated Brookside until 1997, when it affiliated with Tenet Healthcare to administer the hospital, which Tenet renamed Doctors Medical Center. In January 2004, Tenet announced that it would not be renewing the leasing arrangement, and the district resumed administration of the hospital on July 31, 2004 until its closure in April 2015.

Financial woes
The hospital was bailed out through several state loan, county funding, and ballot measure schemes throughout the 2000s decade as it struggled to remain open. The hospital also struggled to secure funding necessary to retrofit and modernize to meet the state's strict earthquake proofing building standards.

In 2006 the Contra Costa County Board of Supervisors approved $20 million of funds to be handed over to the hospital. This deal came with the condition of heightened county scrutiny over the medical center's bookkeeping. Half came from the county's emergency reserves and half from county administered federal Medicaid funds. This deal permitted the center to continue ambulance services.

In 2011, a mail-only special election ballot measure, measure J was approved by 74% of the voters and will cost $47 per parcel annually as long as the facility remains open. The measure was supported by the local chambers of commerce and the local tax payer's advocate group even abstained from having a position on the matter. It is projected to raise approximately $5 million annually.

Although the hospital had been able to stay afloat, it had to cut costs to the "bone" including discontinuing obstetrics. It was one of only two hospitals that accept Medi-Cal in the county which comprise 80% of its users, while 10% have private insurance or none whatsoever, respectively.

Also in September 2011 Richmond mayor Gayle McLaughlin along with area state senator Loni Hancock and the mayors of Hercules, Pinole, and El Cerrito lobbied governor Jerry Brown for loan guarantees. The hospital and the lender would have guaranteed loans so the hospital would have funding and the state would repay the lender if the hospital can not. It was approved by Brown on October 9.

In March 2015, the West County Health District Board voted to close the hospital and sell the property. The estimated $7.5 million from the sale would satisfy employee, physician, and vendor liabilities. The hospital closed on April 21, 2015.

Facilities
In 2005, Doctors Medical Center employed 1,100 people and was the primary radiation and cardiac center in the area.  It also provided cancer treatment, obstetrics (until 2006), and burn care.  At the time, it offered the only full service emergency room in west Contra Costa County, receiving 41,000 patients annually. Because of this, its repeated near-closings and bankruptcies over the years were a matter of significant public interest.

The site, when open, was accessible by AC Transit bus lines 70, 72, 72R, and L that connected it with Richmond BART and Amtrak, San Francisco, El Cerrito del Norte BART, Pinole, El Sobrante, Berkeley, and Oakland.  It had a heliport located on the ground in front of the main entrance.

References

External links

 Official website
 This hospital in the CA Healthcare Atlas A project by OSHPD

Hospital buildings completed in 1954
San Pablo, California
Hospitals in the San Francisco Bay Area
1948 establishments in California
Hospitals in Contra Costa County, California